A body swap (also named mind swap or soul swap or brain swap) is a storytelling device seen in a variety of science and supernatural fiction, in which two people (or beings) exchange minds and end up in each other's bodies. In media such as television and film, the device is an opportunity for two actors to temporarily play each other's characters, although in some cases, dialogue is dubbed by the original actors.

Description
There are different types of body swapping. For non-technology swapping, switches can be caused by magic items such as amulets, heartfelt wishes, or just strange quirks of the universe. The switches typically reverse after the subjects have expanded their world views, gained a new appreciation for each other's troubles by literally "walking in another's shoes" and/or caused sufficient amounts of farce. Notable examples include the books Vice Versa (1882) and  Freaky Friday (1972), as well as the film versions of both.

Switches accomplished by technology, exempting gadgets advanced sufficiently to appear as magic, are the fare of mad scientists. Body-swapping devices are usually characterized by a highly experimental status, straps, helmets with many complicated cables that run to a central system and a tendency to direly malfunction before their effects can be reversed. Those without such means may resort to brain transplants. Such experiments can have overtones of horror or erotism.

Appearances in fiction and drama

See also
 BeAnotherLab
 Brain transplant
 Head transplant
 Mind uploading in fiction
 Soul dualism
 Soul loss
 Transmigration

References

External links 
 10 Cliches of the Body Swap Movie—Archive of a Spout post at Indiewire

 
Fantasy tropes
Fictional elements introduced in 1882
Narratology